The Nation Party (Turkish: Millet Partisi) is a conservative and nationalistic political party in Turkey. It was formed when in 1992 the Reformist Democracy Party (Islahatçı Demokrasi Partisi), led by Aykut Edibali, renamed itself.

References

External links
The Nation Party's official site 

1992 establishments in Turkey
Conservative parties in Turkey
National conservative parties
Nationalist parties in Turkey
Political parties established in 1992
Political parties in Turkey